Mexican entertainer Paulina Rubio has released four video albums and has appeared in fifty music videos and three guest appearances. From her debut studio album La Chica Dorada (1992), she released music videos for the singles "Mío" and "Amor De Mujer", all directed by Ángel Flores and released from 1992–93. For the first of these, she earned an nomination ERES Award for Best Video. She followed with three other music videos from her second album 24 Kilates (1993), "Nieva, Nieva", "Él Me Engañó" and "Asunto De Dos", directed by Ángel Flores, Daniel Gruener and Tito Lara, respectively Rubio's third studio album El Tiempo Es Oro (1995) spawned the singles "Te Daría Mi Vida" and "Nada De Ti", whose music videos was directed by Carlos Marcovich. This was followed by Planeta Paulina'''s videos: "Siempre Tuya Desde La Raíz", a futuristic video with a concept cosmic and 70's dance, "Solo Por Ti", recorded in a barren desert of Mexico and "Enamorada", which tells the story of gay couple. The three videos was directed by Tito Lara from 1992-1997. 

Rubio's fifth studio album, the eponymous Paulina (2000) produced the music videos in 2000 for "Lo Haré Por Ti" directed by Carlos Somonte, "El Último Adiós" directed by Pedro Torres and "Y Yo Sigo Aquí" directed by Gustavo Garzón, who she worked for the first time. For the last of these, she earned three nominations MTV Video Music Awards International Viewer's Choice — Latin America and an accolade Ritmo Latino Music Awards for Best Music Video. "Yo No Soy Esa Mujer", "Vive El Verano" and "Tal Vez, Quizá" was produced in 2001. The video for "Yo No Soy Esa Mujer", directed by Gustavo Garzón earned an nomination Latin Grammy Awards for Best Short Form Music Video. Rubio released four music videos for her sixth studio album Border Girl (2002), including the English and Spanish versions "I'll Be Right Here (Sexual Lover)", "Don't Say Goodbye", "The One You Love" and "Casanova".

For her seventh studio album Pau-Latina (2004), Rubio released four music videos. "Te Quise Tanto" was directed by Gustavo Garzón, while "Algo Tienes" and "Dame Otro Tequila" were directed by Dago Gonzáles. The fourth video of the album, "Mía" was directed by Picky Talarico. "Te Quise Tanto" won an accolade at the 2005 Lo Nuestro Awards for Video of the Year. Rubio's eighth album Ananda (2006) spawned music videos for the songs "Ni Una Sola Palabra", "Nada Puede Cambiarme", "Ayúdame", and "Que Me Voy A Quedar", while for her ninth album Gran City Pop released music videos for the songs "Causa Y Efecto", with two different takes; "Ni Rosas Ni Juguetes", other Mr. 305 Remix version features rapper Pitbull of the song and "Algo De Ti". During that period she worked with directors Paul Boyd, Gabriel Coss and Israel Lugo, Paula Falla, Rudi Dolezal and Jessy Terrero.

The following years, Rubio released her tenth studio album Brava!, with "Me Gustas Tanto" as its lead single. The video was directed by herself and Gustavo López Mañas. In 2012 she reissued her third album as Bravísima!'' and also released videos for the singles "Me Voy" and "Boys Will Be Boys". This last video was directed by Yasha Malekzad and nominate for Best Music Video at Premios Tu Mundo.

Rubio's eleventh album Deseo (2018) spawned music videos for the songs: "Mi Nuevo Vicio" with the Colombian band Morat; "Si Te Vas" original and reguetton version with Alexis & Fido; "Me Quema"; "Desire (Me Tienes Loquita)" with Venezuelan Nacho; and the power pop ballad "Suave y Sutil" . In 2019, she reissu a special edition of the album and produced the music video "Ya No Me Engañas". In all that era, she worked with director Alejandro Pérez and Michel García. The last two music videos of Rubio, released independently, are "Si Supieran" and "De Qué Sirve", directed by Milcho.

In addition to her main music videos, Rubio has collaborated with other artists. Her most outstanding musical duets are: "When You Say Nothing at All (Nada Más Que Hablar)" with Irish artis Ronan Keating, "Nada Fue Un Error" with Coti and Julieta Venegas, "Nena" with Spanish artist Miguel Bosé, "Golpes en el Corazón" with Mexican norteño band Los Tigres del Norte and "Vuelve" with Spanish DJ and singer Juan Magán and rapper DCS.

Music videos

Guest appearances

Video albums

References

Rubio, Paulina